= Yu Seung-wan =

South Korean footballer

Personal information
- Date of birth: 6 February 1992 (age 34)
- Place of birth: South Korea
- Height: 1.82 m (5 ft 11 1/2 in)
- Position: Forward

Youth career
- Eonnam High School
- 2011–2014: Sungkyunkwan University

Senior career*
Years	Team	Apps	(Gls)
2016	Daejeon Citizen	22	(2)
- * Club domestic league appearances and goals as of 1 December 2016

Yu Seung-wan (Korean: 유승완; born 6 February 1992) is a South Korean footballer who plays as forward for Daejeon Citizen in K League Classic.

== Career ==
Yu joined K League Challenge side Daejeon Citizen in January 2016.
